Asura vivida is a moth of the family Erebidae first described by Francis Walker in 1865. It is found on Sulawesi and the Bacan Islands in Indonesia.

References

vivida
Moths described in 1865
Moths of Indonesia